Marjan Šemrl (born July 18, 1954) is a Slovenian chess player. He is received the ICCF title of International Correspondence Chess Grandmaster in 2007.

Early life
He started to play chess at the age of 18. He participated in chess tournaments in former Yugoslavia. After ten years of competition he left to fully devote himself to a professional career and family.

Career 
He returned to chess in 1996. In 1999 he fulfilled FIDE International Master norm and after this success was awarded the Slovenian national master title. He competed in correspondence chess tournaments beginning in 2000. In 2003 he won the Slovenia correspondence chess championship. In 2011 he won the 24th World Correspondence Chess Championship (2009–2011).

Personal life 
He lives in a small village near Ljubljana and works as a software development project manager. He is the married father of two daughters. He serves as vice president of Slovenia Correspondence Chess Federation Council.

References

External links
 
 
 
 

1954 births
Living people
World Correspondence Chess Champions
Correspondence chess grandmasters
Slovenian chess players
Yugoslav chess players